Mikhail Ivanovich Lebedev (4 November 1811 – 13 July 1837) was a Russian painter.

Biography

Lebedev was born in Dorpat into the family of an impoverished serf. In the 1820s, serfdom was abolished in his region and the young Lebedev got an opportunity to study at a nearby school. His artistic endeavours attracted the attention of the Count Pahlen, who sent Lebedev to the Academy at Saint Petersburg with a full scholarship. In the Academy, Lebedev studied under Maxim Vorobiev. In 1833, he got the major gold medal for the painting View of Ladoga.

In 1834, he travelled to Italy on a pension and was met by the Russian artistic colony there, notably the native Karl Brullov. Lebedev loved to paint Italy’s natural landscapes; his landscape paintings are full of coloristic contrasts. Notable paintings derived from this period are Ariccia (near Rome) and View of Castel Gandolfo. Lebedev’s landscapes had an immediate success with the public. In 1837, Lebedev went to work in Naples, where an epidemic of cholera started. The artist became ill and died at the age of twenty-five.

References

External links

Olga's Gallery
Biography @ RusArtNet
Biography @ "Russian Painting"

1811 births
1837 deaths
19th-century painters from the Russian Empire
Russian male painters
Deaths from cholera
Infectious disease deaths in Campania
People from Tartu
19th-century male artists from the Russian Empire